Clay County is a county in the U.S. state of Minnesota. As of the 2020 census, the population was 65,318. Its county seat is Moorhead.

Clay County is part of the Fargo, ND-MN Metropolitan Statistical Area.

History
The county was formed on March 8, 1862, although its government was not organized at that time. In 1872, the organization was effected. It was named for nineteenth-century political figure Henry Clay, member of the United States Senate from Kentucky, and US Secretary of State. The county was originally called Breckinridge, but soon (in 1862) was changed to Clay.

Geography

Clay County lies on the western side of Minnesota. Its western boundary line abuts the eastern boundary line of the state of North Dakota (across the Red River). The Red River flows northward along the western boundary line of the county, on its way to the Hudson Bay in Canada. The Buffalo River flows west-northwesterly through the center of the county, joined by the South Branch Buffalo River west of Glyndon, before discharging into the Red on the county's western border near Georgetown. The terrain consists of rolling hills, dotted with lakes and ponds in its eastern portion. The terrain slopes to the west and north, with its highest point near the southeastern corner, at 1,430' (436m) ASL.

Major highways

Adjacent counties

 Norman County - north
 Becker County - east
 Otter Tail County - southeast
 Wilkin County - south
 Richland County, North Dakota - southwest
 Cass County, North Dakota - west

Protected areas

 Aspen State Wildlife Management Area
 Bjornson State Wildlife Management Area
 Bluestone Prairie Scientific and Natural Area
 Clay County State Wildlife Management Area
 Cromwell State Wildlife Management Area
 Felton Prairie Scientific and Natural Area
 Goose Prairie State Wildlife Management Area
 Gruhl State Wildlife Management Area
 Hawley State Wildlife Management Area
 Hay Creek State Wildlife Management Area
 Highland State Wildlife Management Area
 Hitterdal State Wildlife Management Area
 Jeral State Wildlife Management Area
 Magnusson State Wildlife Management Area
 Skree State Wildlife Management Area
 Ulen State Wildlife Management Area
 Ulen Wildlife Refuge

Climate and weather

Demographics

2000 census
As of the 2000 census, there were 51,229 people, 18,670 households, and 12,340 families in the county. The population density was 49.0/sqmi (18.9/km2). There were 19,746 housing units at an average density of 18.9/sqmi (7.30/km2). The racial makeup of the county was 93.99% White, 0.52% Black or African American, 1.44% Native American, 0.88% Asian, 0.03% Pacific Islander, 1.67% from other races, and 1.47% from two or more races. 3.65% of the population were Hispanic or Latino of any race. 40.4% were of Norwegian and 26.8% German ancestry.

There were 18,670 households, out of which 33.80% had children under the age of 18 living with them, 53.90% were married couples living together, 8.80% had a female householder with no husband present, and 33.90% were non-families. 26.10% of all households were made up of individuals, and 10.60% had someone living alone who was 65 years of age or older. The average household size was 2.53 and the average family size was 3.07.

The county population contained 25.00% under the age of 18, 17.10% from 18 to 24, 25.70% from 25 to 44, 19.30% from 45 to 64, and 12.90% who were 65 years of age or older. The median age was 32 years. For every 100 females, there were 93.70 males. For every 100 females age 18 and over, there were 89.10 males.

The median income for a household in the county was $37,889, and the median income for a family was $49,192. Males had a median income of $34,176 versus $23,149 for females. The per capita income for the county was $17,557. About 7.40% of families and 13.20% of the population were below the poverty line, including 13.30% of those under age 18 and 7.50% of those age 65 or over.

2020 Census

Government and Politics
In national elections, Clay County has been a swing district for several decades. From 1992 to 2020, it has voted for the winner of the presidential election.

Communities

Cities

 Barnesville
 Comstock
 Dilworth
 Felton
 Georgetown
 Glyndon
 Hawley
 Hitterdal
 Moorhead (county seat)
 Sabin
 Ulen

Census-designated places
 Baker
 Oakport (part of Moorhead since 2015)

Unincorporated communities

 Dale
 Downer
 Kragnes
 Manitoba Junction
 Muskoda
 Rollag
 Rustad
 Tansem
 Winnipeg Junction

Townships

 Alliance Township
 Barnesville Township
 Cromwell Township
 Eglon Township
 Elkton Township
 Elmwood Township
 Felton Township
 Flowing Township
 Georgetown Township
 Glyndon Township
 Goose Prairie Township
 Hagen Township
 Hawley Township
 Highland Grove Township
 Holy Cross Township
 Humboldt Township
 Keene Township
 Kragnes Township
 Kurtz Township
 Moland Township
 Moorhead Township
 Morken Township
 Oakport Township
 Parke Township
 Riverton Township
 Skree Township
 Spring Prairie Township
 Tansem Township
 Ulen Township
 Viding Township

See also
 National Register of Historic Places listings in Clay County, Minnesota

References

External links

 Clay County official website

 
Minnesota counties
Fargo–Moorhead
1872 establishments in Minnesota
Populated places established in 1872